David Butler (born 1 September 1962) is an English former professional footballer who played as winger.

Career
Born in Wolverhampton, Butler played youth football for hometown club Wolverhampton Wanderers, before turning professional with Torquay United. Butler made 6 appearances for Torquay in the Football League during the 1981–82 season. He later played non-League football for Stafford Rangers.

References

1962 births
Living people
English footballers
Wolverhampton Wanderers F.C. players
Torquay United F.C. players
Stafford Rangers F.C. players
English Football League players
Association football wingers